Bjørn Iversen (born 18 March 1953) is a Norwegian politician for the Labour Party.

From 1989 to 1990, during the cabinet Syse, Iversen was appointed State Secretary in the Ministry of Agriculture.

He served as a deputy representative to the Norwegian Parliament from Nord-Trøndelag during the terms 1993–1997 and 1997–2001.

On the local level Iversen is the mayor of Verdal since 2005.

References

1953 births
Living people
Deputy members of the Storting
Labour Party (Norway) politicians
Mayors of places in Nord-Trøndelag
Norwegian state secretaries
People from Verdal